Hamer is an unincorporated community and census-designated place (CDP) in Dillon County, South Carolina, United States. It was first listed as a CDP in the 2020 census with a population of 820.

Hamer is home to Hamer Hall, a residence from 1890 listed on the National Register of Historic Places. It is also the location of South of the Border, a famed tourist trap just before the state line with North Carolina; and it is the home of Blenheim Ginger Ale.

Geography
Its elevation is 144 feet (44 m).

Demographics

2020 census

Note: the US Census treats Hispanic/Latino as an ethnic category. This table excludes Latinos from the racial categories and assigns them to a separate category. Hispanics/Latinos can be of any race.

References

Unincorporated communities in Dillon County, South Carolina
Unincorporated communities in South Carolina
Census-designated places in Dillon County, South Carolina
Census-designated places in South Carolina